Besnyő is a village in Dunaújváros District of Fejér County in Hungary.

References

External links 
 Street map 

Populated places in Fejér County